The Fundamental Tour (also known as Fundamental Live) was a concert tour by English electronic duo Pet Shop Boys. The tour supported the group's ninth studio album, Fundamental. Beginning in June 2006, the trek played over 100 dates in Europe, the Americas, Australia and Asia. The tour lasted over 17 months.

Setlist

Tour dates

Festivals and other miscellaneous performances

Cancellations and rescheduled shows

Cast and crew
 Neil Tennant
 Chris Lowe

Dancers
 Nathan Holiday
 Ivan "Swan" Blackstock

Singers
 Sylvia Mason-James
 Nick Clow
 Andy Lowe

Additional musicians
 Pete Gleadall – Musical Director & Programming

Box office score data

DVD release
The show was filmed at the Auditorio Nacional in Mexico on 14 November 2006, and was released on DVD format as Cubism in 2007.

External links
 Pet Shop Boys – official website.
 Songs That the Pet Shop Boys Have Performed Live – Commentary by Wayne Studer, PhD  Interpretations and analyses of every song written or performed by Pet Shop Boys

References

2006 concert tours
2007 concert tours
Pet Shop Boys concert tours